Chuck Kleinhans (October 2, 1942December 14, 2017) was an associate professor of film studies at Northwestern University for 32 years and co-founded Jump Cut with Julia Lesage and John Hess. He co-edited the journal from its inception in 1974 until his death.

In 2007, the Society for Cinema and Media Studies awarded him its Outstanding Pedagogical Achievement Award.

Early life and education

Charles Nelson Kleinhans was born in a working-class neighborhood of Chicago. In the early 1950s, his family moved to suburban Park Ridge.

He graduated from Maine Township High School in 1960, a classmate of Harrison Ford. He then enrolled in the University of Wisconsin–Madison, from which he earned a Bachelor of Arts in comparative literature.

Kleinhans was in NROTC in college and after graduating was obligated to spend two years in the Navy. Afterward, he resumed his study of comparative literature as a graduate student at Indiana University. There, in Bloomington, he met his future spouse, Julia Lesage, a fellow graduate student.

Career
After earning a PhD in comparative literature, Kleinhans found temporary teaching jobs at Chicago State University (fall 1974–fall 1975) and Northeastern Illinois University (winter 1976–winter 1977). In spring 1977, Northwestern University's Radio/Television/Film Department hired him to teach courses on contemporary film theory and experimental film. In fall of that year, he started a tenure-track line at Northwestern as an assistant professor and taught "introductory courses in microcomputer graphics, photography, film and video making, media literacy, popular culture; [and] advanced courses in production in aesthetics, film/tv theory, mass culture theory, experimental film and video, Latin America media." He also shepherded over 40 dissertations. He was subsequently tenured and promoted to associate professor. After 32 years at Northwestern, he retired (2009) and became an associate professor.

Aside from his long tenure at Northwestern, Kleinhans is best known for his part in the founding and editing of Jump Cut, a media-studies journal. He, Julia Lesage, and John Hess conceived Jump Cut as their time at Indiana University was coming to an end. The first issue was released in 1974. The three edited it collectively until the deaths of Hess and Kleinhans. As stated in an editorial in the first issue, Jump Cut'''s principal goal was:Jump Cut'' was printed in tabloid form from 1974 to 2001, when it made the transition to an online publication as ejumpcut.org.

Later life and death
During his time teaching in Evanston, Kleinhans continued to live in Chicago. After retiring from Northwestern in 2009 as an associate professor, he moved to Eugene, Oregon where his spouse had long taught at the University of Oregon. He died of heart failure after a brief illness on December 14, 2017.

References

External links
Official Website
Jump Cut online (ejumpcut)
Chuck & Chow: tumblr created by Kleinhans
SCMS Tribute to Chuck Kleinhans
Vita, on Academia

1942 births
2017 deaths
Academics from Illinois
People from Chicago
University of Wisconsin–Madison College of Letters and Science alumni
Indiana University alumni
Northwestern University faculty